Antonio Calderón Vallejo (born 31 March 1984) is a Spanish professional footballer who plays for St Joseph's in Gibraltar. Mainly a left winger, he can also play as a left back.

Club career
Born in Ronda, Málaga, Andalusia, Calderón joined Málaga CF's youth setup in 2000, aged 16, after starting out at hometown club CD Ronda. He made his debuts as a senior with the reserves in the 2002–03 campaign, winning promotion from Segunda División B.

On 30 August 2003 Calderón played his first match as a professional, starting in a 2–3 away loss against UD Almería in the Segunda División championship. He scored his first goal on 9 November, netting the first of a 5–2 home win against Xerez CD.

In the 2006 summer, after both main and reserve squad suffered relegations, Calderón moved to Real Jaén in the third level. After three full seasons appearing regularly (only missing almost the whole 2007–08 campaign due to injury), he returned to Ronda, in Tercera División.

On 25 January 2011 Calderón joined third-tier club Extremadura UD. After suffering relegation, he subsequently continued his career in the fourth level, representing Jerez CF, Arandina CF, Unión Estepona CF and Vélez CF.

On 15 January 2014 Calderón went on a trial at Polish I Liga side Legionovia Legionowo, signing a contract shortly after. On 1 July, after appearing regularly, he signed a one-year deal with Ekstraklasa's Arka Gdynia. In January 2016, he joined Lincoln Red Imps, winning two titles during his time at the club. However, in August 2018, he signed for St Joseph's.

References

External links
 
 
 

1984 births
Living people
People from Ronda
Sportspeople from the Province of Málaga
Spanish footballers
Footballers from Andalusia
Association football defenders
Association football wingers
Segunda División players
Segunda División B players
Tercera División players
Atlético Malagueño players
Real Jaén footballers
Extremadura UD footballers
Arandina CF players
Legionovia Legionowo players
Arka Gdynia players
MKP Pogoń Siedlce players
Lincoln Red Imps F.C. players
Spanish expatriate footballers
Expatriate footballers in Poland
Spanish expatriate sportspeople in Poland